A list of windmills in the German state of Lower Saxony.

A

B

C

D

E

F

G

H

I

J

K

L

M

N

O

P

Q

R

S

T

U

V

W

Z

References

Windmills
Lower Saxony
Tourist attractions in Lower Saxony
Lower Saxony-related lists